Geser may refer to:

 Epic of King Gesar
Geser, Indonesia, a village on the southeast coast of Seram Island
Geser language, a language of Seram Island
Geser 3A   Graffiti Artist based in the United States

See also
Geyser